Kostas Choumis (born 20 November 1913 in Piraeus, Greece – deceased 20 July 1981 in Athens) was a Greek-Romanian football player who played as a striker. He is often regarded in Greece and Romania as one of the greatest strikers in the 1930s.

Club career 

Kostas Choumis made his senior debut in 1933, playing for Ethnikos Piraeus, a team from his hometown. Shortly after his debut, he became a certainty for the starting lineup. He won the South Division championship with Ethnikos Piraeus in 1934–1935 season, scoring 15 goals in 10 matches. The National Championship was not held in 1934–1935 season, but the next year it was played, and Choumis became the top scorer of the league, with 12 goals scored in 14 matches.

In 1936, Kostas moved to Romanian club Venus București, after scoring two goals against Romania a year earlier. He played his first match in Divizia A against Telefoane București.

He remains in history as the first scorer for a Romanian team in the European competitions, scoring the first goal of Venus București in the First Round of 1937 Mitropa Cup, against Ujpest FC from Hungary. The match was lost by Venus, 4–6, with Choumis scoring also the last goal of the Romanian team.

Kostas Choumis won three times the Divizia A champion title, but did not win the Romanian Cup. He played in the last three matches of the 1940 Romanian Cup final, when, after two replays of the final (in the first replay, ended 4-4, Kostas Choumis scored himself two goals) Rapid București won the third replay and the final.

He remained at Venus during World War II but left in 1946 to play for Rapid București. He played at Rapid only half of a season, afterwards moving at IT Arad, where he played just one game but won the championship. In 1947 he went to play at Karres Mediaş, where he played a season along Ştefan Dobay. He played for the Mediaş-based team until 1950, and, after a short spell at IT Arad, he retired from the playing career.

International career 
Kostas Choumis made his debut for the Greece national football team in December 1934, in a Balkan Cup match against Yugoslavia. A few days later, in a match against Romania, Kostas scored his first international goal.

In the 1935 Balkan Cup, he scored two braces, the first against Bulgaria and the second against Romania, caughting the eye of the Romanian club Venus București with the later; however, his efforts were in vain as Greece failed to win either game, losing 2-5 and drawing 2-2 respectively. In the following edition of the Balkan Cup, he again scored a brace against Bulgaria, to bring his total tally in the Balkan Cup up to 7 goals, which means he is among the all-time top goal scorers in the competition's history.

In his last match for Greece, he scored the only goal for his team in Cairo, but the Greeks lost the game against Egypt.

In 1941, after five years of living in Romania, Kostas made his debut for Romania, in a match against Slovakia. He scored the first goal for The Tricolours, and Romania won 3–2.

His last international match came in June 1943, playing another match against Slovakia. The match ended as a draw, 2-2.

International Goals

Goals for Greece 
Greece score listed first, score column indicates score after each Choumis goal.

 Goals for Romania Romania score listed first, score column indicates score after each Humis goal.

Honours

Club 
Ethnikos Piraeus
Greek South Division Championship (1): 1934–35
Venus București
Divizia A (3): 1936–37, 1938–39, 1939–40
Cupa României runner-up: 1939–40
UTA Arad
Divizia A (1): 1946–47

International
Greece

Balkan Cup:
Runners-up (1): 1934-35

Individual 
Panhellenic Championship (1): 1935–36 (12 goals)

References

External links 

1913 births
1979 deaths
Greece international footballers
Greek expatriate sportspeople in Romania
Association football forwards
Footballers from Piraeus
Expatriate footballers in Romania
Ethnikos Piraeus F.C. players
Dual internationalists (football)
Liga I players
Liga II players
Venus București players
FC Rapid București players
FC UTA Arad players
CS Gaz Metan Mediaș players
PAS Giannina F.C. managers
Egaleo F.C. managers
Ethnikos Piraeus F.C. managers
Greek football managers
Greek expatriate footballers
Greek footballers